Kim Clavel is a Canadian professional boxing who held the WBC female light flyweight title until February of 2022, where she lost a unification title bout against Jessica Nery Plata.

Professional career 
Clavel made her professional debut on December 16, 2017, scoring a four-round unanimous decision (UD) against Yoseline Martinez Jose at Place Bell in Laval, Quebec.

After compiling a record of 11–0 (2 KO), Clavel faced Esmeralda Gaona Sagahon for the vacant WBC-NABF female light flyweight title on December 7, 2019 at the Bell Centre in Montreal. Clavel won her first professional title via UD, with all three judges scoring the bout 100–90.

In 2021 she was a competitor in the Quebec edition of Big Brother Célébrités.

On September 6th 2022 it was announced that Kim Clavel and Jessica Nery Plata would be squaring off for a world female junior flyweight title unification fight on December 1.  The 10-round bout will take place at the Place Bell in Laval, Canada.

Professional boxing record

References

External links 
 

Year of birth missing (living people)
Date of birth missing (living people)
Living people
Canadian women boxers
Boxers from Montreal
Light-flyweight boxers
Big Brother Canada contestants